Ayigya is a town in Ghana. It is 10 kilometres from the centre  Kumasi. It is a dormitory town. There is a market in the community which serves both its inhabitants as well as students from the Kwame Nkrumah University of Science and Technology.

Boundaries
The town is bordered on the north by Maxima, to the West by Bomso, to the east by Asokore Mampong and to the South by Kentinkrono.

References

Populated places in Kumasi Metropolitan Assembly